Chepstow is an Italianate house museum located at 120 Narragansett Avenue in Newport, Rhode Island, built in 1860. It originally served as a summer "cottage", but the Preservation Society of Newport County now owns the property. It was listed in the National Register of Historic Places as part of the Ochre Point-Cliffs Historic District in 1975 and within the Historic District of the City of Newport.

History

Edmund Schermerhorn hired George Champlin Mason, Sr. to build the house in 1860 as a summer home. Schermerhorn was a first cousin of Mrs. Astor (formerly Caroline Webster Schermerhorn), one of Newport's most active hostesses.

In 1911, it was sold to Emily Lorillard (née Morris) Gallatin, the wife of Rolaz Horace Gallatin, a cousin of Albert Eugene Gallatin and nephew of Commodore Elbridge Thomas Gerry. The property, named for Chepstow, the town in Wales that the Morris family came from, overlooks Narragansett Avenue. Emily was first cousin of Lewis Gouverneur Morris who married Anita de Braganza and owned Malbone in Newport.

The property remained in her family's possession until it was donated to the Preservation Society in 1986 upon Alletta Morris McBean's death. The house has been altered through additions, the most recent in 1979 with the addition of the garden room (also called the sun room) by architect John K. Grosvenor. It opened to the public in 1998 following Peter McBean's death.

Present day
Beginning in June 1998. The property houses a dynamic collection of art and furniture, including some from other Morris family residences. Among the American paintings bequeathed to the Society that hung at Chepstow were works by George Harvey, Fitz Hugh Lane and Granville Perkins. Among the furnishings is a walnut Queen Anne side chair reportedly owned by William Penn.

References
Notes

Sources

External links
Official site 

Houses completed in 1860
Italianate architecture in Rhode Island
Museums in Newport, Rhode Island
Historic house museums in Rhode Island
Villas in the United States
Schermerhorn family